The commissure of inferior colliculus, also called the commissure of inferior colliculi is a thin white matter structure consisting of myelinated axons of neurons and joining together the paired inferior colliculi.

It is evolutionarily one of the most ancient interhemispheric connections.

References 

Inferior colliculus
Corpora quadrigemina
Tectum
Midbrain